Czechoslovakia competed at the 1964 Summer Olympics in Tokyo, Japan. 104 competitors, 95 men and 9 women, took part in 64 events in 13 sports. The most successful competitor was Věra Čáslavská (one of only 9 women in crew) with 4 medals - 3 gold and one team silver. Other big surprises were gold medal performances of the cyclist Jiří Daler and weightlifter Hans Zdražila, who broke a world record during his performance. Medal hopes of world record holder athlete Ludvík Daněk were fulfilled with little disappointment, in the form of a silver medal.

Medalists

Athletics

Boxing

Canoeing

Cycling

Nine cyclists represented Czechoslovakia in 1964.

Individual road race
 Daniel Gráč
 Jiří Daler
 František Řezáč
 Jan Smolík

Sprint
 Ivan Kučírek

1000m time trial
 Jiří Pecka

Tandem
 Karel Paar
 Karel Štark

Individual pursuit
 Jiří Daler

Team pursuit
 Jiří Daler
 Antonín Kříž
 Jiří Pecka
 František Řezáč

Football

Gymnastics

Rowing

Sailing

Shooting

Four shooters represented Czechoslovakia in 1964. Lubomír Nácovský won a bronze medal in the 25 m pistol event.

25 m pistol
 Lubomír Nácovský
 Ladislav Falta

50 m pistol
 Vladimír Kudrna

300 m rifle, three positions
 Vladimír Stibořík

50 m rifle, three positions
 Vladimír Stibořík

50 m rifle, prone
 Vladimír Stibořík

Swimming

Volleyball

Men's Team Competition
 Round robin
 Defeated Hungary (3-2)
 Defeated Bulgaria (3-2)
 Defeated Japan (3-1)
 Defeated United States (3-0)
 Lost to Soviet Union (2-3)
 Defeated Brazil (3-0)
 Defeated Romania (3-1)
 Defeated Netherlands (3-1)
 Defeated South Korea (3-1) →  Silver Medal
Team Roster
 Antonín Procházka
 Jiří Svoboda
 Luboš Zajíček
 Josef Musil
 Josef Smolka
 Vladimír Petlák
 Petr Kop
 František Sokol
 Bohunil Golián
 Zdeněk Groessl
 Pavel Schenk
 Drahomír Koudelka  
Head coach: Václav Matiášek

Weightlifting

Wrestling

References

External links
Official Olympic Reports
International Olympic Committee results database
Czech olympic report (in Czech)

Nations at the 1964 Summer Olympics
1964
Summer Olympics